The Trent Valley line is a railway line between Rugby and Stafford in England, forming part of the West Coast Main Line. It is named after the River Trent which it follows. The line was built to provide a direct route from London to North West England and Scotland, and avoid the slower route between Rugby and Stafford via Birmingham.

Places served
The cities, towns and villages served by the line are listed below.
Stafford
Rugeley
Lichfield
Tamworth
Polesworth 
Atherstone
Nuneaton
Rugby

Services
A range of intercity and long-distance services use the route. Avanti West Coast and London Northwestern Railway operate all services on the route.

These call at all stations on the route, except  which is served only by one daily northbound service.
These rarely call at more than one station on the route, and many services do not call at all.

History 
The Trent Valley line was opened in 1847 to give a more direct route from London to the North West of England, bypassing the existing route via Birmingham built by the Grand Junction Railway and the London and Birmingham Railway a decade earlier. The engineers were Robert Stephenson (no relation to John), George Parker Bidder and Thomas Longridge Gooch and the architect was John William Livock.

Construction was initially started by an independent company, the Trent Valley Railway (TVR), which was established in Manchester in April 1844. Its act of incorporation received royal assent on 21 July 1845. Construction of the line commenced in November 1845, the first sod being cut ceremonially at Tamworth by Sir Robert Peel on 13 November.  In September 1845 Salford-born 26-year-old Edward Watkin was appointed secretary, and having entered the railway world via the TVR he later went on to become one of Britain's most prominent railway barons.

Whilst under construction, the TVR was bought by the London and Birmingham Railway (L&BR) on 15 April 1846, the L&BR itself amalgamating with other railways to form the London and North Western Railway (LNWR) on 16 July 1846. The largest single engineering feature of the line was the  Shugborough Tunnel near Stafford. The Trent Valley line was opened to a limited service of local passenger trains and through goods trains on 15 September 1847, to local goods trains on 20 October 1847 (the delay due to the goods-handling facilities at the stations not being completed) and finally to all through traffic on 1 December 1847. It is now part of what is called the West Coast Main Line.

The line was originally built with two tracks, but growing traffic meant that several stretches were widened to four tracks between 1871 and 1909.

Electrification
The line was electrified on the 25 kV AC system during the 1960s, in the wake of the 1955 British Rail modernisation plan.

2004 to 2008 works 
Prior to this work being carried out, the West Coast Main Line had four tracks between London and Rugby, comprising a "fast line" and a "slow line" in each direction (the slow lines diverting via the Northampton Loop Line). Similarly, there were four tracks north of Stafford. When plans for the modernisation of the WCML were being developed in the 1990s, it was realised that these arrangements could not accommodate the faster Pendolino trains as well as slower local services. It was therefore decided to increase the number of tracks between Lichfield and Armitage to four; later it was decided to extend this from Tamworth as well, giving four tracks throughout from Nuneaton to Colwich Junction, north of Rugeley. The two outer tracks are "slow", while the "fast" lines are the two innermost tracks.

Work started in 2004, and access roads were built on the eastern side of the line. Substantial earthworks were carried out and 37 bridges were replaced. A level crossing at Hademore was replaced by two road bridges in early 2007. The four-track railway between Lichfield North and Armitage was brought into use on 29 May 2008. Concurrently, Lichfield Trent Valley signal box was closed and within a month had been demolished. On 8 September the same year, the four-track railway between Tamworth and Lichfield came into use and Tamworth signal box closed.

Additionally, the line between Rugby and Brinklow, formerly three tracks, was quadrupled on 27 May 2008. The line from Brinklow to Nuneaton remains three tracks. A  section north-west of Colwich Junction, which passes through the  Shugborough Tunnel, remains double track.

As well as the civil engineering works, the whole of the Trent Valley line has been resignalled. The work was completed in September 2008, at a cost of around £350 million.

New rolling stock 
Along with the modernisation improvements, new rolling stock operates along the Trent Valley line. Class 350 Desiro electric multiple units started operation on  11 December 2006. The Desiro trains replace the outdated passenger trains that previously ran on the line.

Accidents
Serious accidents to have occurred on the Trent Valley line include:
1860 – Atherstone rail accident; 10 killed. 13 injured.
1870 – Tamworth rail crash; 3 killed, 13 injured.
1946 – Lichfield rail crash; 20 killed, 21 injured. 
1947 – Polesworth derailment; 5 killed, 64 injured.
1975 – Nuneaton rail crash; 6 killed, 38 injured.
1986 – Colwich rail crash; 1 killed, 75 injured.

Notes

References 

The Railway Magazine, August 2006
Railway Track Diagrams – Midlands & North West, 

Railway lines in the West Midlands (region)
Rail transport in Staffordshire
Rail transport in Warwickshire
Railway lines opened in 1847
Standard gauge railways in England
1847 establishments in England
London and North Western Railway